Alfonso de Nigris Guajardo (born June 15, 1976), known professionally as Poncho de Nigris, is a Mexican television host, entrepreneur and influencer. He hosted various shows for the Monterrey-based regional network Multimedios Televisión, including the Sunday night variety show Poncho en Domingo. His brothers are the former football players Antonio and Aldo de Nigris.

De Nigris first came to prominence in the second season of Big Brother México in 2003, where he placed third in the competition. He would later be the contestant in the 2011 cycle of Multimedios's dating competition Mitad y Mitad involving a season-long process of finding him a partner, and hosted Pura Gente Bien on sister channel XHSAW-TDT, along with El Club del Italiano for Televisa Regional's MTYtv; the latter would be cancelled in 2013 after making jokes targeting the station's anti-bullying campaign.

He returned to television in February 2015 with the premiere of Poncho en Domingo on Multimedios, where he was paired with co-host Marcela Mistral. The two fell in love and after a proposal to Mistral by de Nigris was accepted. De Nigris and Mistral were married in a televised ceremony on the network recorded on November 23, 2015, and aired on November 25.

Television career 
 Big Brother México, 2nd season, Televisa/Endemol
 Codigo Postal, Televisa (actor)
 Central de abastos, Televisa (actor)
 Vivalavi, Multimedios Televisión (co-host)
 Mitad y mitad, Juegos de amor Multimedios TV (contestant)
 Metemegol,  Multimedios (actor)
 En busca del Ponchoballet..., Multimedios (co-host)
 PGB (Pura Gente Bien), Multimedios (co-host)
 El Club del Italiano, XHCNL-TDT/Televisa Regional (host)
 Poncho en Domingo, Multimedios TV (host)

External links
 Official Website

References

1976 births
Living people
Mexican male models
Mexican people of Italian descent
People from Monterrey